Valentino Pugliese (born 18 July 1997) is a Swiss professional footballer who is currently a free agent and last played as a midfielder for Bulgarian First League club Beroe.

Club career
He has previously played for Wil, Schaffhausen and Chiasso in the Swiss Challenge League. In February 2020, he joined Bulgarian club Lokomotiv Plovdiv. In July 2022, Pugliese joined Beroe.

Honours

Club
Lokomotiv Plovdiv
 Bulgarian Cup: 2019–20

References

External links
 

1997 births
Living people
Swiss men's footballers
Swiss expatriate footballers
Association football midfielders
Switzerland youth international footballers
Swiss Challenge League players
First Professional Football League (Bulgaria) players
Eerste Divisie players
Grasshopper Club Zürich players
FC Basel players
FC Zürich players
FC St. Gallen players
FC Wil players
FC Schaffhausen players
FC Chiasso players
PFC Lokomotiv Plovdiv players
FC Dordrecht players
FC Tsarsko Selo Sofia players
PFC Beroe Stara Zagora players
Expatriate footballers in Bulgaria
Expatriate footballers in the Netherlands
Swiss expatriate sportspeople in Bulgaria
Swiss expatriate sportspeople in the Netherlands
Footballers from Zürich